is a district in Nan'yō City, Yamagata, Japan. Okigō has one elementary school and one junior high school.

Nan'yō, Yamagata